One Canadian: The Political Memoirs of the Rt. Hon. John G. Diefenbaker was a Canadian biographical television miniseries which aired on CBC Television from 1976 to 1977.

Premise
John Munro filmed more than nine hours of interviews with former Canadian Prime Minister John Diefenbaker in late 1974. Episodes included this footage combined with historic photographs and other film footage of Diefenbaker. As a memoir, the series provided little critical examination of Diefenbaker's political career.

Production
Douglas Rain supplied narration in place of the actual interviewers such as Thomas Van Dusen. Wilfred Doucette was the series director of photography. Herbert Helbig composed the series music, and its theme was performed by the Canadian Brass.

Scheduling
This half-hour series was broadcast on Wednesdays at 8:30 p.m. from 6 October 1976 to 6 January 1977.

Episodes
 1, 2: childhood and early legal career
 3, 4: political career since 1919, to his 1940 election to the House of Commons of Canada after a series of unsuccessful election attempts, until his 1956 election as leader of the Progressive Conservative Party
 5 to 11: from opposition leader to election as Prime Minister, then his return to opposition
 12: loss of the Progressive Conservative party leadership in 1967
 13: Diefenbaker's summary of his career and observations on government

References

External links
 
 

CBC Television original programming
1976 Canadian television series debuts
1977 Canadian television series endings
John Diefenbaker